Bernadette Roberts (1931–2017) was a former Carmelite nun and contemplative in the Catholic tradition.

Biography

Bernadette Roberts was born in 1931 in California to devout Catholic parents.  She entered the Monastery of Discalced Carmelites in Alhambra, California when she was seventeen in January 1949.  After eight and a half years of monastic life, Roberts left the cloister and entered the University of Utah where she was a pre-medical student for three years.  After studies in Utah she returned to her parents' home in Hollywood, California, and obtained a degree in philosophy from the University of Southern California.  She taught physiology and algebra at Our Lady of Loretto High School in Los Angeles for four years, where she met and married a fellow teacher, with whom she had four children.  Roberts went on to obtain a Montessori credential in London, England, and opened her own Montessori school in Kalispell, Montana, in 1969.  In her Montessori school, Roberts repeated all of Piaget's cognitive (developmental) experiments with children.  In 1973 she obtained a master's degree in early childhood education from the University of Southern California.  In 1976, Roberts's husband left her and the children, after which she obtained a church annulment.   Between trying to earn a living, raise her children, and helping out with grandchildren, Roberts had a very busy life.  For the last forty years she annually made extended retreats with the Camaldolese Monks on the Big Sur in California.  She often said that "Camaldoli is my only true home on this earth."  Roberts died in 2017 in her home in Southern California in her sleep.

Spiritual life and experiences

Roberts extensively chronicled and described her life and spiritual journey. Her book Contemplative: Autobiography of the Early Years presents an account of her early family life and spiritual experiences. Her spiritual journey after entering the cloister is described in The Path to No-Self: Life at the Center.  This book includes descriptions of her experience of the "Dark Nights" and of the state of "Union," as spoken of by various Christian mystics.  After years of life in union with God, Roberts described an event she calls the experience of "no-Self" in The Experience of No-Self: A Contemplative Journey. The book, however, only covers a two-year period after the events described.  Roberts further elaborated on the context for this event. After the first publication of The Experience, Roberts was invited to speak around the country, to present her talk, "A Passage Through Self," that uses a series of circles to illustrate the spiritual journey. For the last 30 years Roberts gave annual retreats entitled "The Essence of Christian Mysticism," in which she presented the essence of Christian mysticism as Trinity, Christ, and Faith. Her last work was The Real Christ (2012).

Works

The following is a list of books, and recordings by Bernadette Roberts:
 The Experience of No-Self: A Contemplative Journey. State University of New York Press (Revised Edition 1993); 
 The Path to No-Self: Life at the Center (1985). State University of New York Press (New Edition 1991); 
 What is Self?: A Study of the Spiritual Journey in Terms of Consciousness. Sentient Publications (2005); 
 The Real Christ.  Bernadette Roberts (2012)
 Essays on the Christian Contemplative Journey.  Bernadette Roberts (2007)
 Contemplative: Autobiography of the Early Years.  Bernadette Roberts (2004)
 "The Essence of Christian Mysticism". Bernadette Roberts (2012, DVD)
 "A Passage Through Self".  Bernadette Roberts (1987, DVD)

Personal life

Roberts shared four children with former husband Ron Danko: Mark, Marcel, Melanie, and Mikayla ('Kayla').
She had seven grandchildren. Throughout her later years Roberts resided in Santa Monica, California, then briefly in Laguna Beach, California, where she died in 2017, one year after she was diagnosed with ALS.

Notes

References

External links
 Bernadette Roberts, a website with information on works, DVDs and retreats

 

Former Roman Catholic religious sisters and nuns
Roman Catholic writers
1931 births
2017 deaths
Place of birth missing
Date of birth missing
20th-century American Roman Catholic nuns
University of Southern California alumni
University of Utah alumni
Carmelite mystics
Christian contemplation